Konsta Viljami Jylhä (14 August 1910 Kaustinen – 13 September 1984 Kokkola) was a folk-virtuoso who, in Finnish fiddling, made the traditional pelimanni-style folk music a Finnish cultural phenomenon of wider currency, bringing his natural genius and traditional style to a burgeoning nationwide television audience, thus laying the foundation for a rich and popular traditional music scene in Finland.

A third generation Central Ostrobothnian master pelimanni (Mestaripelimanni); in the 1960s Jylhä's band Konsta Jylhä ja Purppuripelimannit became a mainstay of the Kaustinen Folk Music Festival, and iconic both in popular culture, and within the generation of master pelimanni to follow in his footsteps.

His best known pieces of original composition are Konstan Parempi Valssi ("Konsta's Major Waltz") and especially the hauntingly beautiful Vaiennut Viulu ("Mute Violin").

After being battered by a severe head injury suffered in a logging accident in 1961 and some heart attacks suffered since 1962, he became a born-again Christian. During his later years he composed spiritual songs.

References

External links 
 Jylhä, Konsta in Biografiskt lexikon för Finland .
 Konsta Jylhä on 10 Euro Silver Coin.

1910 births
1984 deaths
People from Kaustinen
Finnish fiddlers
Male violinists
Nordic folk musicians
Finnish male composers
Finnish bandleaders
20th-century violinists
20th-century male musicians
20th-century Finnish composers